Scotty Bloch (born Maybelle Scott) was an American East Coast-based stage and television actress.

Career 
Bloch worked as an actress since the 1940s. Her television work included playing Lucille O'Brien in the dramatic series Kay O'Brien and a recurring role on Kate and Allie as Jane Curtin's mother. In 1980, she appeared on Broadway in Mark Medoff's Children of a Lesser God, at the Longacre Theatre in New York. She also starred in the Oscar and Palme d'Or-winning 1989 film The Lunch Date, written and directed by Adam Davidson.

Personal life
Bloch married Daniel Bloch in 1948. They remained wed until his death in 2013. They had two sons, Andrew and Anthony.

Filmography

References

External links

1925 births
2018 deaths
American film actresses
American stage actresses
American television actresses
Actresses from New Rochelle, New York
21st-century American women